Take It Home is the fifth album by the progressive bluegrass band Hot Rize.

Track listing
 Colleen Malone (Drumm, Goble) 3:07
 Rocky Road Blues  (Monroe) 2:13
 A Voice on the Wind (H. Waller) 3:16
 Bending Blades (O'Brien) 3:19
 Gone Fishing (Wernick) 2:57
 Think of What You've Done (Stanley) 2:24
 Climb the Ladder (Forster) 2:23
 Money to Burn (Hutchison) 3:33
 The Bravest Cowboy (trad.) 2:34
 Lamplighting Time in the Valley (Goodman, Hart, Lyons, Poulton) 3:08
 Where the Wild River Rolls (Amos) 3:56)
 The Old Rounder (Wernick) 3:01
 Tenderly Calling (Garrett) 4:42

Personnel
 Nick Forster – bass, vocals
 Tim O'Brien – vocals, mandolin, violin
 Pete Wernick – banjo, vocals
 Charles Sawtelle – guitar, vocals

References

External links
Official site

1990 albums
Hot Rize albums
Sugar Hill Records albums